Guépard was the lead ship of her class of destroyers (contre-torpilleur) built for the French Navy during the 1920s.

After France surrendered to Germany in June 1940 during World War II, Guépard served with the navy of Vichy France. She was among the ships of the French fleet scuttled at Toulon, France, on 27 November 1942. Her wreck later was salvaged and scrapped.

Notes

References

 
 

World War II warships scuttled at Toulon
Guépard-class destroyers
1928 ships
Ships built in France
Maritime incidents in November 1942